Ceratogyne is a genus of flowering plants in the family Asteraceae.

There is only one known species, Ceratogyne obionoides, endemic to Australia, and found in Western Australia, South Australia, Victoria, and New South Wales.

References

Monotypic Asteraceae genera
Astereae
Endemic flora of Australia
Taxa named by Nikolai Turczaninow
Plants described in 1851